Lemuel Haynes (July 18, 1753 – September 28, 1833) was an American clergyman.  A veteran of the American Revolution, Haynes was the first black man in the United States to be ordained as a minister.

Haynes was a native of West Hartford, Connecticut, and was the son of an African American man and a white woman.  He spent much of his childhood as an indentured servant in the house of a Granville, Massachusetts farmer.  A regular churchgoer, he began to preach as a boy.  He served in the militia during the American Revolution, including garrison duty at the recently captured Fort Ticonderoga in 1776.  Haynes also became an anti-slavery activist.  In addition to arguing against involuntary servitude and preaching against the slave trade, Haynes also advocated against the colonization movement, arguing that people of African descent living in the United States should be entitled to the same rights as other citizens, and that having them resettle in Africa would not be beneficial.

Ordained in the Congregational church in 1785, Haynes pastored a church in Torrington, Connecticut for three years.  In 1788, Haynes accepted a call to pastor the West Parish Church of Rutland, Vermont (now West Rutland's United Church of Christ), where he remained for the next 30 years.  He then moved to a temporary pastorate at Manchester, Vermont, and finally to South Granville, New York, where he was pastor of South Granville Congregational Church.

Haynes died in South Granville in 1833, and was buried at Lee-Oatman Cemetery in South Granville.

Early life and education
Haynes was born on July 18, 1753 in West Hartford, Connecticut, reportedly to a Caucasian mother of some status and an unknown man who was African or African-American.  The identity of Haynes's mother has long been the subject of debate among historians and theologians.  The most prevalent theory is that she was a servant named Lucy or Alice Fitch who worked for the John Haynes family of West Hartford.  Another theory suggests that Fitch was a stand-in, willing or unwilling, for his real mother.  According to this theory, Haynes's mother was a member of the prominent Goodwin family of Hartford who tried to avoid the scandal associated with giving birth while unmarried by staying with the Haynes family.  Both theories suggest that Lucy (or Alice) Fitch was fired by the Haynes family after she attested to or was accused of being the mother.  She named her son Haynes, either to give him respectability or to take revenge against the Hayneses for firing her.

At the age of five months, Lemuel Haynes was given over to indentured servitude to Deacon David Rose, a blind farmer of Granville, Massachusetts.  Part of the indenture required Rose to see to Haynes's education, and by accompanying Rose to church, he became exposed to Calvinistic religious doctrine, including the works of Jonathan Edwards, George Whitefield, and Philip Doddridge, who all became strong influences on Haynes' religious outlook.  According to Haynes, while David Rose fulfilled his indenture obligations to Haynes, Rose's wife Elizabeth (Fowler) (d. 1775) was especially devoted to his upbringing, to the point of treating him as though he was her own child.

Military service
Freed in 1774 when his indenture expired, Haynes joined the minutemen of Granville.  In 1775, he marched with his militia company to Roxbury, Massachusetts, following the news of the Battles of Lexington and Concord.  In 1776, he accompanied them in the garrisoning of the recently captured Fort Ticonderoga.  He remained on garrison duty until contracting Typhus, which caused him to return home.

Writings
During the American Revolution, Haynes began to write extensively, criticizing the slave trade and slavery. He continued these activities after the war, and also began to prepare sermons, family prayers and other theological works. The Scripture, abolitionism, and republicanism affected his published writings, in which Haynes argued that slavery denied black people their natural rights to "Life, Liberty and the pursuit of happiness".  Paralleling the recent American experience with oppression to the slave experience, Haynes wrote: "Liberty is equally as precious to a black man, as it is to a white one, and bondage as equally as intolerable to the one as it is to the other".

Ministry

After his militia service, Haynes studied theology with members of the clergy in Connecticut and Massachusetts. He received his license to preach in 1780, along with a position as temporary 'supply' to his home congregation in Middle Granville. About the same time, he began his many years of service as a missionary in the wilderness of the New Hampshire Grants, soon to be known as the independent Vermont Republic and finally the American state of Vermont.

Haynes was ordained in 1785 and settled at Hemlock Congregational Church in Torrington, Connecticut. He was the first African American ordained in the United States. On March 28, 1788, Haynes left his pastorate at Torrington to accept a call at the West Parish Church of Rutland, Vermont (now West Rutland's United Church of Christ), where he led the mostly white congregation for 30 years.

Haynes continued to write and speak about slavery.  His contemporary white republican and abolitionist thinkers did see slavery as a liability to the new country, but most argued for eventual slave expatriation to Africa. The American Colonization Society (founded in 1817) was the largest colonization group. Included among its supporters were people such as James Madison, James Monroe, Henry Clay and Daniel Webster. The ACS was strongly supported in Vermont. In contrast, Haynes continued to passionately argue along Calvinist lines that God's providential plan would defeat slavery and lead to the harmonious integration of the races as equals.

After asking for and accepting dismissal from West Rutland in 1818, he took a temporary post at Manchester.  His final pastorate was in South Granville, New York where he was minister of the South Granville Congregational Church from 1822 to 1833.

Haynes died in South Granville, and was buried at Lee-Oatman Cemetery in South Granville.  He had composed his own epitaph, which was included on his gravestone as he had requested.

Family
While living in Middle Granville in the early 1780s, Haynes met and married Elizabeth Babbitt (1763-1836), a white schoolteacher.  Their children included:

	i.	  Elizabeth (b. November 1785 Granville, Mass., d. 6 Sep 1866 Rutland)

	ii.	  Eunice (b. 3 March 1789 Rutland, d. 2 January 1859 Granville, New York)	

	iii.	  Louis (b. 1790 Rutland, d. 12 January 1828 Granville, New York)

	iv.	  Electa (b. 26 July 1791 Rutland, d. after 1833 Granville, New York)

	v.	  Lemuel, Jr. (b. 11 July 1794 Rutland, d. after 1850)

	vi.	  Sarah (b. 6 May 1796 Rutland, d. August 1841 Granville, New York)

	vii.      Olive (b. 9 August 1798 Rutland, d. 19 September 1823 Middlebury)

	viii.     Pamela (b. 14 October 1800 Rutland)

	ix.	  Samuel Woodbridge (b. 11 January 1803 Rutland, d. after 1 March 1885 Kansas)

	x.	  William Babbitt (twin, b. 11 January 1803 Rutland, 3 March 1839 at sea)

Legacy
Middlebury College granted Haynes an honorary master of arts in 1804, the first honorary degree ever bestowed upon an African American.

Historian John Saillant (2003, p. 3) writes that Haynes's "faith and social views are better documented than those of any African American born before the luminaries of the mid-nineteenth century."

The Lemuel Haynes House, Hayne's home in South Granville, New York when he was pastor of the South Granville Congregational Church, was declared a National Historic Landmark in 1975.  In 2009, it was purchased from Charles Halderman by Bo Young and William Foote, formerly of Brooklyn.

References

Further reading
Thabiti M. Anyabwile. The Faithful Preacher: Recapturing the Vision of Three Pioneering African-American Pastors  (2007).
Lemuel Haynes. May We Meet in the Heavenly World: The Piety of Lemuel Haynes  (2009).
Lemuel Haynes. "Liberty Further Extended, 1776"  (Volume 1, 2013)
Sidney and Emma Nogrady Kaplan. The Black Presence in the Era of the American Revolution. Amherst, Massachusetts: The University of Massachusetts Press, 1989. .
John Saillant. Black Puritan, Black Republican: The life and thought of Lemuel Haynes, 1753-1833. New York, Oxford University Press, 2003. .

External links

The Life and Thought of Lemuel Haynes a podcast interview with Thabiti M. Anyabwile
 
 

1753 births
1833 deaths
Activists for African-American civil rights
Activists from New York (state)
African-American abolitionists
African-American Christian clergy
African-American college graduates before 1865
American Calvinist and Reformed ministers
American Christian clergy
Black Patriots
Congregationalist abolitionists
Massachusetts militiamen in the American Revolution
People from Granville, Massachusetts
People from Granville, New York
People from West Hartford, Connecticut